Freebird Live (originally Freebird Cafe) was a music venue located in Jacksonville Beach, Florida.  They closed their doors with a final concert on January 21, 2016.

Overview
The venue opened on September 8, 1999, with a concert by The Charlie Daniels Band. The cafe featured Lynyrd Skynyrd memorabilia, food and recorded music.

In 2005, the owners considered moving the venue location to accommodate a larger capacity and big-name acts. Buildings in Atlantic Beach, Florida and Jacksonville, Florida were considered. However, the owners decided to renovate its current location in lieu of moving.

Jacksonville bands that played at Freebird Live include the Gregg Allman Band (d.2017) in '02, Dickey Betts & Great Southern in '02, Yellowcard in '02, Shinedown in '03, Red Jumpsuit Apparatus in '04, and Cold in 2010. Florida bands that played at Freebird Live include most of the famous Florida bands in the 00s including: Gainesville's Sister Hazel in '08, Less Than Jake in '05, and Against Me! in '07; Orlando's Trivium in '09, Tremonti (guitarist for Creed) in '15, and Blood on the Dance Floor in '12; Underoath in '05, The Almost in '07, Mayday Parade in '11, Anberlin in '12, Copeland in '06, We the Kings in '11, Nonpoint in '10, New Found Glory in '10, and Iron & Wine in '05.

The venue closed its doors permanently following a performance from Galactic on January 20, 2016. The building is now occupied by Surfer the Bar.

Performances at Freebird Live

References

Music venues in Florida
Buildings and structures in Duval County, Florida
Tourist attractions in Duval County, Florida